The Lualdi-Tassotti ES 53 was an Italian experimental helicopter designed by Carlo Lualdi around a Hiller-designed rotor system and a gyro stabiliser of his own design. It first flew at Campoformido in September 1953.

The helicopter was powered by a single 63.4 kW (85 hp) Continental C85 engine and proved so promising that Lualdi purchased a licence to produce the Hiller rotor system in Italy, and formed a new company, Aer Lualdi to develop and market his designs as the Aer Lualdi L.55.

Specifications

References

1950s Italian experimental aircraft
1950s Italian helicopters
Single-engined piston helicopters
Aircraft first flown in 1953